Theo Schetters (21 April 1896 – 7 December 1973) was a Dutch footballer. He played in one match for the Netherlands national football team in 1927.

References

External links
 

1896 births
1973 deaths
Dutch footballers
Netherlands international footballers
Place of birth missing
Association footballers not categorized by position